was the second concubine of Emperor Meiji, and the mother of his first daughter Wakatakayori-hime no Mikoto (稚高依姫尊). Wakatakayori-hime no Mikoto was stillborn, and Natsuko died of complications from her delivery.

Natsuko was a daughter of the noblewoman Hashimoto Reiko (橋本麗子, 1835-1889), and she entered Meiji's service as a concubine in 1872. Natsuko's tomb is at Toshimagaoka Imperial Cemetery at Gokoku-ji in Bunkyo, Tokyo.

See also
Empress Shōken, primary consort of Emperor Meiji, later Empress Dowager
Hamuro Mitsuko, first concubine
Yanagihara Naruko, third concubine of Emperor Meiji, mother of Emperor Taishō
Chigusa Kotoko (千種任子), fourth concubine
Sono Sachiko, fifth concubine

References 

Imperial House of Japan
1856 births
1873 deaths
Japanese concubines
Emperor Meiji
Deaths in childbirth